This is a list of individual awards achieved by the Geelong Football Club since it joined the Victorian Football League in 1897.

VFL/AFL

Awards

Other honours

Media awards

Club awards and honours

Carji Greeves Medal

AFL Women's Best and Fairest

Leading goalkicker

Other awards

VFL best and fairest

VFL Women's best and fairest

Geelong's Team of the Century

Hall of Fame 
The Geelong Football Club Hall of Fame reflects the contributions of players and coaches who have made significant contributions to the club across their respective careers.  The club inducts individuals into the Hall of Fame on a case-by-case basis, and although there is no provision for automatic inclusion, the individual needs to satisfy a selection of criteria to be considered for induction. Consideration will only be given once the player or coach has been retired for a minimum of three years, and individuals who have both played and coached for Geelong may have their records combined for consideration.

Players generally need to meet a minimum of four of the following ten criteria to be considered for inclusion:
 Ten years’ service as a VFL/AFL player (including on the rookie list)
 Played 200 senior matches (does not include pre-season, night series or representative matches)
 Club captain for at least two years
 Winner of the Carji Greeves Medal
 Placed in top-three for Carji Greeves Medal on at least four occasions (applies from 1960 onwards)
 Premiership player (with each premiership counting as one guideline being met)
 Selected for All-Australian team
 Winner of the Brownlow Medal or Champion of the Colony
 Placed in top-three for Brownlow Medal on at least two occasions
 Winner of the Coleman Medal or competition's leading goalkicker award

Coaches generally need to meet the following three criteria to be considered for inclusion:
 Six years’ service as the VFL/AFL senior coach
 Premiership coach (with each premiership counting as one guideline being met)
 Qualified for the VFL/AFL finals series on at least five occasions as senior coach

Life membership 
Whilst the club may award life membership to any person who has dedicated outstanding service to the Geelong Football Club, players automatically qualify for life membership once they achieve any of the following criteria for the club:

 Inducted into the Geelong Football Club Hall of Fame
 Played 150 senior games
 Played 100 senior games, and is a premiership player
 Played 50 senior games, a premiership player and at least one of the following:
 Brownlow Medal winner
 Carji Greeves Medal winner
 Selected in All-Australian team or (prior to 1990) Victorian team
 Inducted in Australian Football Hall of Fame
 Geelong Football Club captain
 Winner of the Coleman Medal or competition's leading goalkicker award
 Ten years’ service as a VFL/AFL player
 Playing in an additional premiership team

Club records

Most club games

Most club goals

Most goals in a game

Notes

References 

Individual Awards And Records